The 1989–90 Liga Leumit season saw Bnei Yehuda won their first, and to date only title, whilst Hapoel Ramat Gan and Shimshon Tel Aviv were relegated to Liga Artzit. Uri Malmilian of Maccabi Tel Aviv was the league's top scorer with 16 goals.

After the first two rounds of matches (22 matches) the league split into two groups of six clubs; a Championship group and a Relegation group, with clubs playing the others in their group twice more.

Regular season

Table

Results

Playoffs

Top playoff

Table

Results

Bottom playoff

Table

Results

References
Israel - List of Final Tables RSSSF

Liga Leumit seasons
Israel
1